The 2001–02 Kazakhstan Hockey Championship was the tenth season of the Kazakhstan Hockey Championship, the top level of ice hockey in Kazakhstan. Seven teams participated in the league, and Kazzinc-Torpedo won the championship. Yertis Pavlodar dropped out of the league before the season began.

Standings

References
Kazakh Ice Hockey Federation

Kazakhstan Hockey Championship
Kazakhstan Hockey Championship seasons
Kaz